Kleitos-Dimitrios Kyrou (13 August 1921 – 10 April 2006) was a Greek poet and translator. He was born in Thessaloniki and he studied at Anatolia College. In 1939, he entered the Law School of the Aristotle University of Thessaloniki. He worked in banking between 1951 and 1983, and he was General Secretary of the National Theatre of Northern Greece between 1974 and 1976.

He made his first literary appearance in 1944, at the students' magazine Beginning, starting with translations of foreign, mainly English, poetry. His first published poem was Expectation (Προσμονή, published in the Thessaloniki magazine Student, issue no. 3, 5 May 1945). In 1949 he published his first book of poetry, titled Pursuit, Recollections from a doubtful era (Αναζήτηση, Αναμνήσεις μιας αμφίβολης εποχής). He collaborated with a plethora of magazines, like Beginning, Student, Free Letters, Diagonal, Our Century, Shell, New Course, Criticism and Parlour. His complete poetic works were published as In whole, 1943–1997 Harvest (Εν όλω, Συγκομιδή 1943–1997, Agra, 1997). In 1988 he was honoured with the Second State Award for Poetry, for his book The birds and the awakening (Τα πουλιά και η αφύπνιση), which he declined. In 1992, he was honoured by the Greek Society of Literary Translators for his translation of Christopher Marlowe's play Doctor Faustus and in 1994 he received the First State Award for Translation, for his translation of Percy Bysshe Shelley's tragedy The Cenci. In 2005, the Academy of Athens bestowed upon him the Kostas and Eleni Ourani Award, for the whole of his poetic oeuvre.

His poems have been translated in English, French, Italian, Spanish, Russian, Polish, Bulgarian and Arab.

He married Philio Angelidou in 1969. His children were Eleni (born 1970) and Giorgos (born 1971).

He died on 10 April 2006 in his own home.

Bibliography

Poetry
Pursuit, Recollections from a doubtful era (Αναζήτηση, Αναμνήσεις μιας αμφίβολης εποχής), Thessaloniki, Th. Graikopoulos, 1949
On first person (Σε πρώτο πρόσωπο), Thessaloniki, 1957
Night screams (Κραυγές της νύχτας), Thessaloniki, 1960
Key numbers (Κλειδάριθμοι), Thessaloniki, E. Sfakianakis, 1963
Apology (Απολογία), Thessaloniki, 1966 (second and supplemented edition, Thessaloniki, 1976)
The constructions 1949–1974 (Οι κατασκευές 1949–1974), Athens, Kedros, 1980
The birds and the awakening (Τα πουλιά και η αφύπνιση), Athens, Nepheli, 1987
Parole season and other poems (Περίοδος χάριτος και άλλα ποιήματα), Thessaloniki, Cheirographa, 1992
The earlier word (Ο πρωθύστερος λόγος), Thessaloniki, Aigeiros, 1996
In whole, 1943–1997 Harvest (Εν όλω, Συγκομιδή 1943–1997, complete works), Athens, Agra, 1997

Prose
Setbacks. Life memoir (Οπισθοδρομήσεις. Αναδρομή ζωής) 2001, autobiography

Translations

Poetry
Modern English poets, Thessaloniki, 1945
Ode to Salvador Dalí and Ode to Walt Whitman, by Federico García Lorca (translated with Manolis Anagnostakis), Thessaloniki, 1948
Lament for Ignacio Sánchez Mejías, by Federico García Lorca, Thessaloniki, Poetic Art, 1950
The Pot of Earth, by Archibald MacLeish, Thessaloniki, New Course, 1958
Belt, by Guillaume Apollinaire, Thessaloniki, New Course, 1962
Ash Wednesday, by T. S. Eliot, Thessaloniki, Diagonal, 1965
Prose of the Trans-Siberian and of Little Jehanne of France, by Blaise Cendrars and Sonia Delaunay, Athens, Diphros, 1965
Poems, by Guillaume Apollinaire (translated with Fani Kiskira and Tolis Kazantzis), Thessaloniki, Diagonal, 1967
Ash Wednesday and Ariel Poems, by T. S. Eliot, Thessaloniki, 1971
Poems, by W. H. Auden, Thessaloniki, 1971
Poems, by Archibald MacLeish, 1973
Foreign voices, Athens, Kedros, 1979
Four Quartets, by T. S. Eliot, Thessaloniki, Diagonal, 1981
Burnt Norton, by T. S. Eliot, Athens, Athens School of Fine Arts, 1988
Ash Wednesday - Ariel Poems - Four Quartets, by T. S. Eliot, Athens, Roptron, 1988
The Waste Land, by T. S. Eliot, Athens, Ypsilon, 1990

Theatre
When Five Years Pass, by Federico García Lorca, 1962
'Tis Pity She's a Whore, by John Ford, Athens, Nepheli, 1986
Doctor Faustus, by Christopher Marlowe, Athens, Agra, 1990
The Cenci, by Percy Bysshe Shelley, Athens, Agra, 1993

References

Modern Greek poets
Greek translators
1921 births
2006 deaths
Writers from Thessaloniki
20th-century translators